Princess Cécile Marie Antoinette Madeleine Jeanne Agnès Françoise of Bourbon-Parma, Countess of Poblet (Spanish: Cecilia María de Borbón-Parma, French: Cécile Marie de Bourbon-Parme; 12 April 1935 – 1 September 2021) was a French humanitarian and political activist. A Carlist, she supported the claims of her father, Prince Xavier, Duke of Parma and Piacenza, to the headship of the House of Bourbon-Parma and his claim to the Spanish throne. She later supported the claim of her older brother, Prince Carlos Hugo, Duke of Parma and his progressive reforms to Carlist ideology over that of her younger brother Prince Sixtus Henry, Duke of Aranjuez's claims and traditionalist stance. An anti-fascist, she opposed the dictatorship of Francisco Franco and was expelled from Spain multiple times for working to promote democratic reforms. During her exile, she made connections in French intellectual circles and attending the 1973 World Congress of Peace Forces and 1974 Berlin Conference. She was present, along with some of her siblings, at the Montejurra massacre in 1976.

Princess Cécile was very involved in humanitarian and religious causes. A trained pilot, she volunteered with the Sovereign Military Order of Malta during the Nigerian Civil War to fly in resources and provide humanitarian aid. Through the United Nations, she worked with the Food and Agriculture Organization in Laos, helped victims of floods in Vallès, and worked as a nurse in a leper colony in Marina Alta. Towards the end of her life, she lived in Paris and was a volunteer with the International Association for Hospice and Palliative Care.

Early life and family 
Princess Cécile was born on 12 April 1935. She was the daughter of Prince Xavier of Bourbon-Parma, Duke of Parma and Piacenza, a Carlist claimant to the Spanish throne, and Madeleine de Bourbon-Busset, the daughter of the Count de Lignières and a member of a cadet branch of the House of Bourbon. She was the younger sister of Princess Marie-Françoise, Prince Carlos Hugo, and Princess Marie Thérèse and an older sister of Princess Marie des Neiges and Prince Sixtus Henry. She was a niece of Austrian empress Zita of Bourbon-Parma.

Princess Cécile was educated in the United States, Quebec, and in Allier before finishing her studies at the Institut Catholique de Paris. On 22 April 1955, she was presented as a debutante at a coming out ball hosted by her parents at the Hôtel Ritz Paris. Her father bestowed her with the title Countess of Poblet.

Activism 

Princess Cécile accompanied her father on a trip to Spain in 1951. In 1956, she moved to Spain, taking charge of the private political secretariat for the Carlists. She was present, along with some of her siblings, at the Montejurra massacre on 9 May 1976.

After her father, who assumed the title Duke of Parma and the role as head of the House of Bourbon-Parma from his nephew, Robert Hugo, Duke of Parma, ceded his role to his oldest son, Prince Carlos Hugo, a political rift occurred in the family. Princess Cécile, Princess Marie Thérèse, and Princess Marie des Neiges supported new progressive Carlist ideologies and the claim of their brother while Princess Marie Françoise, Prince Sixtus Henry, and their mother opposed the claim and political and ideological reforms. Described by her family as a "Carlist militant" and a "tireless fighter", she was active in Spanish political reforms throughout the 1960s and 1970s. She was expelled from Francoist Spain on several occasions due to her political activism and anti-fascist views, as she worked to recover democratic freedoms that had been taken away by the dictatorship.

Princess Cécile worked as a nurse at the Fontilles leper colony in Marina Alta, volunteered to help victims of the floods in Vallès, and worked for the Food and Agriculture Organization in Laos. When the Nigerian Civil War began in 1967, she volunteered with the Sovereign Military Order of Malta as a pilot, flying into the country to bring humanitarian aid. She had previously trained as a pilot and skydiver. She rescued orphaned children during the war and distributed food, flying between Biafra and Libreville. Princess Cécile was awarded the Cross of the Order pro Merito Melitensi by the Sovereign Military Order of Malta for her humanitarian work during the Nigerian Civil War. She returned to Spain after the war but was expelled by Francisco Franco in 1971.

While in exile, she and her sister, Marie Thérèse, were active in the Exterior Front of the Carlist Party. She made contacts with various intellectuals while exiled in France indluding Marcel Niedergang, André Malraux, Louis Leprince-Ringuet, Gaston Monnerville, Bishop Daniel Pezeril, and Manuel Azcárate.

She attended the 1973 World Congress of Peace Forces in Moscow and attended an ecumenical meeting sponsored by Patriarch Pimen I of Moscow. In 1974, she attended the Berlin Conference, a progressive Catholic conference.

She was also passionate about Catholic theology and archiving. She lived her last years in Paris, where she volunteered with the International Association for Hospice and Palliative Care.

Last years, death and burial 

In addition to Carlist activities, in her last years Cécile Marie also took part in events for the Ducal House of Bourbon-Parma. On 5 April 2014, she acted as godmother at the baptism of Princess Cecilia Maria of Bourbon-Parma, the daughter of her nephew. In July of the same year, during an interview with a newspaper, Cécile Marie spoke about her sister Marie Thérèse, when asked why her sister had never married, Cécile Marie stated that "She has a very high standard. If she were presented with an opportunity, she would have seized it. But nothing in line with her aspirations has come to distract her from her cult of independence." In 2016 Cécile Marie returned to Parma, where she had already been in 2014 and 2012, to participate in the baptism of Prince Charles Henry of Bourbon-Parma, third son of the Duke of Parma. On that occasion the Princess was photographed while being helped to walk by her sisters Marie Thérèse and Marie des Neiges and by her nephew Prince Charles-Henri de Lobkowicz, who represented Princess Marie Françoise. In the same year she visited the ancient ducal lands, and in particular the city of Fontanellato, where she was received by the mayor, Francesco Trivelloni.

In 2018, Cécile Marie and her sisters Marie Thérèse and Marie des Neiges reconciled with their older sister, Marie Françoise, with whom they had come into conflict because of their different views on Carlism. The sisters spent a lot of time together after reconciling.
 
In the last years of her life, Princess Cécile Marie suffered from several diseases that led her to be cared for by her sisters and a nurse. Princess Cécile Marie died in Paris on 1 September 2021, five days after she attended the funeral of her sister Princess Marie Thérèse. Her death was announced in an official statement made by her nephew, Prince Carlos, Duke of Parma. A Catholic funeral was held at the Notre-Dame-des-Champs, Paris on 10 September 2021. She was cremated, and her remains were buried in the family crypt in Sanctuary of Santa Maria della Steccata in Parma, Italy.

The funeral mass was attended by members of her family including the Duke of Parma and Piacenza; Prince Jaime, Count of Bardi; Princess Margarita, Countess of Colorno; Princess Carolina, Marchioness of Sala; Princess Marie-Françoise, Princess Edouard de Lobkowicz; Princess Marie des Neiges, Countess of Castillo de La Mota; Prince Amaury of Bourbon-Parma and Prince Charles-Henri de Lobkowicz.

Ancestry

Honours 
 :
 Senator Grand Cross with necklace of the Angelic Imperial Holy Constantinian Order of St. George
 Grand Cross of the Ducal Royal Order of Saint Louis
 Grand Cross of the Order of Prohibited Legitimacy
 :
 Cross of the Order pro Merito Melitensi

References

External links 

Official website of the House of Bourbon-Parma
Second official website of the House of Bourbon-Parma
Biography of Her Royal Highness Princess Cécile Marie

1935 births
2021 deaths
20th-century Roman Catholics
21st-century Roman Catholics
Burials at the Sanctuary of Santa Maria della Steccata
Carlists
Debutantes
FAO Goodwill ambassadors
Female anti-fascists
French anti-fascists
French humanitarians
French people of Italian descent
French people of Spanish descent
French Roman Catholics
French women activists
French women aviators
French women nurses
Institut Catholique de Paris alumni
Nobility from Paris
Princesses of Bourbon-Parma
Recipients of the Order pro Merito Melitensi
Spanish anti-fascists
Spanish countesses
Women humanitarians